The Tatars is an umbrella term for different Turkic ethnic groups bearing the name "Tatar". Initially, the ethnonym Tatar possibly referred to the Tatar confederation. That confederation was eventually incorporated into the Mongol Empire when Genghis Khan unified the various steppe tribes. Historically, the term Tatars (or Tartars) was applied to anyone originating from the vast Northern and Central Asian landmass then known as Tartary, a term which was also conflated with the Mongol Empire itself. More recently, however, the term has come to refer more narrowly to related ethnic groups who refer to themselves as Tatars or who speak languages that are commonly referred to as Tatar.

The largest group amongst the Tatars by far are the Volga Tatars, native to the Volga-Ural region (Tatarstan and Bashkortostan), who for this reason are often also known as "Tatars" in Russian. They compose 53% of the population in Tatarstan. Their language is known as the Tatar language. , there were an estimated 5.3 million ethnic Tatars in Russia.

While also speaking languages belonging to different Kipchak sub-groups, genetic studies have shown, that the three main groups of Tatars (Volga, Crimean, Siberian) do not have common ancestors and thus, their formation occurred independently of each other. Regarding the Crimean Tatars especially, it has been considered, whether they should even be called Tatars, citing these ethnogenetic differences. Therefore, they are also known simply as "Crimeans" (qırımlılar). A minority of Volga Tatars have tried to replace the term with "Bulgar" (or Bolgar), claiming heritage over Bulgars of Volga Bulgaria. This theory is counted as the second main theory for their formation, other being the Kipchak-theory.

Many noble families in the Tsardom of Russia and Russian Empire had Tatar origins.

Etymology

Tatar became a name for populations of the former Golden Horde in Europe, such as those of the former Kazan, Crimean, Astrakhan, Qasim, and Siberian Khanates. The form Tartar has its origins in either Latin or French, coming to Western European languages from Turkish and the Persian language ("mounted messenger"). From the beginning, the extra r was present in the Western forms and according to the Oxford English Dictionary this was most likely due to an association with Tartarus. 

The Persian word is first recorded in the 13th century in reference to the hordes of Genghis Khan and is of unknown origin, according to OED "said to be" ultimately from tata.

All Turkic peoples living within the Russian Empire were named Tatar (as a Russian exonym). Some of these populations still use Tatar as a self-designation, others do not.
 Kipchak groups
 Kipchak–Bulgar branch or "Tatar" in the narrow sense
 Volga Tatars
 Astrakhan Tatars       
 Lipka Tatars
 Kipchak–Cuman branch
 Crimean Tatars
 Dobrujan Tatars
 Karachays and Balkars: Mountain Tatars
 Kumyks: Daghestan Tatars
 Crimean Karaites: Crimean Karaite Tatars / Karaite Tatars
 Krymchaks: Crimean Krymchak Tatars / Krymchak Tatars
 Kipchak–Nogai branch:
 Nogais: Nogai Tatars
 Siberian Tatars
 Siberian branch:
 Altaians: Altai Tatars, including the Tubalar or Chernevo Tatars
 Chulyms or Chulym Tatars
 Khakas: Yenisei Tatars (also Abakan Tatars or Achin Tatars), still use the Tatar designation
 Shors: Kuznetsk Tatars
 Oghuz branch
 Azerbaijanis: Caucasus Tatars (also Transcaucasia Tatars or Azerbaijan Tatars)
The term is originally not just an exonym, since the Polovtsians of Golden Horde called themselves Tatar. It is also an endonym to a number of peoples of Siberia and Russian Far East, namely the Khakas people. (тадар, tadar).

Languages

11th century Kara-khanid scholar Mahmud al-Kashgari noted that the historical Tatars were bilingual, speaking other Turkic languages besides their own language.

The modern Tatar language, together with the Bashkir language, forms the Kypchak-Bolgar (also "Uralo-Caspian") group within the Kipchak languages (also known as Northwestern Turkic).

There are two Tatar dialects—Central and Western. The Western dialect (Misher) is spoken mostly by Mishärs, the Central dialect is spoken by Kazan and Astrakhan Tatars. Both dialects have subdialects. Central Tatar furnishes the base of literary Tatar.

The Siberian Tatar language is independent of Volga–Ural Tatar. The dialects are quite remote from Standard Tatar and from each other, often preventing mutual comprehension. The claim that Siberian Tatar is part of the modern Tatar language is typically supported by linguists in Kazan and denounced by Siberian Tatars.

Crimean Tatar is the indigenous language of the Crimean Tatar people. Because of its common name, Crimean Tatar is sometimes mistakenly seen in Russia as a dialect of Kazan Tatar. Although these languages are related (as both are Turkic), the Kypchak languages closest to Crimean Tatar are (as mentioned above) Kumyk and Karachay-Balkar, not Kazan Tatar. Still, there exists an opinion (E. R. Tenishev), according to which the Kazan Tatar language is included in the same Kipchak-Cuman group as Crimean Tatar.

Contemporary groups and nations

The largest Tatar populations are the Volga Tatars, native to the Volga-Ural region, and the Crimean Tatars of Crimea. Smaller groups of Lipka Tatars and Astrakhan Tatars live in Europe and the Siberian Tatars in Asia.

Volga Tatars

The Volga Bulgars, who settled on the Volga river in the 7th century AD and converted to Islam in 922 during the missionary work of Ahmad ibn Fadlan, inhabited the present-day territory of Tatarstan. After the Batu Khan invasions of 1223–1236, the Golden Horde annexed Volga Bulgaria. Most of the population survived, and a certain degree of mixing between it and the Kipchaks of the Horde ensued. The group as a whole accepted the exonym "Tatars" (finally in the end of the 19th century; although the name Bulgars persisted in some places; the majority identified themselves simply as the Muslims) and the language of the Kipchaks; on the other hand, the invaders eventually converted to Sunni Islam ( 14th century). As the Golden Horde disintegrated in the 15th century, the area became the territory of the Kazan khanate, which Russia ultimately conquered in the 16th century.

Some Volga Tatars speak different dialects of the Tatar language. Accordingly, they form distinct groups such as the Mişär group and the Qasim group:
 Mişär-Tatars (or Mishars) are a group of Tatars speaking a Mishar dialect of the Tatar language. They live in the Chelyabinsk, Tambov, Penza, Ryazan and Nizhegorodskaya oblasts of Russia and in Bashkortostan and Mordovia. They live on the right bank of the Volga River, in Tatarstan.
 The Western Tatars have their capital in the town of Qasím (Kasimov) in Ryazan Oblast, with a Tatar population of 1100.

A minority of Christianized Volga Tatars are known as Keräşens.

The Volga Tatars used the Turkic Old Tatar language for their literature between the 15th and 19th centuries. It was written in the İske imlâ variant of the Arabic script, but actual spelling varied regionally. The older literary language included many Arabic and Persian loanwords. However, the modern literary language (generally written using a Cyrillic alphabet), often has Russian- and other European-derived words instead.

Outside of Tatarstan, urban Tatars usually speak Russian as their first language (in cities such as Moscow, Saint-Petersburg, Nizhniy Novgorod, Tashkent, Almaty, and in cities of the Ural region and western Siberia) and other languages in a worldwide diaspora.

In the 1910s the Volga Tatars numbered about half a million in the Kazan Governorate in Tatarstan, their historical homeland, about 400,000 in each of the governments of Ufa, 100,000 in Samara and Simbirsk, and about 30,000 in Vyatka, Saratov, Tambov, Penza, Nizhny Novgorod, Perm and Orenburg. An additional 15,000 had migrated to Ryazan or were settled as prisoners in the 16th and 17th centuries in Lithuania (Vilnius, Grodno and Podolia). An additional 2000 resided in St. Petersburg.

Most Kazan Tatars practise Islam. The Kazan Tatars speak Kazan (normal) tatar language, with a substantial amount of Russian and Arabic loanwords.

Before 1917, polygamy was practiced only by the wealthier classes and was a waning institution.

An ethnic nationalist movement among Kazan Tatars that stresses descent from the Bulgars is known as Bulgarism—graffiti have appeared on the walls in the streets of Kazan with phrases such as "Bulgaria is alive" (Булгария жива).

Astrakhan Tatars

The Astrakhan Tatars (around 80,000) are a group of Tatars, descendants of the Astrakhan Khanate's population, who live mostly in Astrakhan Oblast. In the Russian census of 2010 most Astrakhan Tatars declared themselves simply as "Tatars" and few declared themselves as "Astrakhan Tatars". Many Volga Tatars live in Astrakhan Oblast, and differences between the two groups have been disappearing.

Crimean Tatars

Crimean Tatars are a relatively  recent ethnic layer in Crimea. They displaced the Greek speaking Byzantines and the remains of the Gothic populations settled there in the 3rd century AD. Crimean tatars gain a distinct identity during the 13th–17th centuries, They incorporated many invading Turkic people, including the Cumans that settled in Crimea in the 10th century and other contributions from the peoples who inhabited Crimea before (Greeks, Scythians, and Goths).

At the beginning of the 13th century, Crimea, where the majority of the population was already composed of a Turkic people—Cumans, became a part of the Golden Horde. The Crimean Tatars mostly adopted Islam in the 14th century and thereafter Crimea became one of the centers of Islamic civilization in Eastern Europe. In the same century, trends towards separatism appeared in the Crimean Ulus of the Golden Horde. De facto independence of Crimea from the Golden Horde may be counted since the beginning of princess (khanum) Canike's, the daughter of the powerful Khan of the Golden Horde Tokhtamysh and the wife of the founder of the Nogai Horde Edigey, reign in the peninsula. During her reign she strongly supported Hacı Giray in the struggle for the Crimean throne until her death in 1437. Following the death of Сanike, the situation of Hacı Giray in Crimea weakened and he was forced to leave Crimea for Lithuania.

In 1441, an embassy from the representatives of several strongest clans of Crimea, including the Golden Horde clans Shırın and Barın and the Cumanic clan—Kıpçak, went to the Grand Duchy of Lithuania to invite Hacı Giray to rule in Crimea. He became the founder of the Giray dynasty, which ruled until the annexation of the Crimean Khanate by Russia in 1783. Hacı I Giray was a Jochid descendant of Genghis Khan and of his grandson Batu Khan of the Golden Horde. During the reign of Meñli I Giray, Hacı's son, the army of the Great Horde that still existed then invaded Crimea from the north, Crimean Khan won the general battle, overtaking the army of the Horde Khan in Takht-Lia, where he was killed, the Horde ceased to exist, and the Crimean Khan became the Great Khan and the successor of this state. Since then, the Crimean Khanate was among the strongest powers in Eastern Europe until the beginning of the 18th century. The Khanate officially operated as a vassal state of the Ottoman Empire, with great autonomy after 1580, because of being a Muslim state, the Crimean Khanate just could not be separate from the Ottoman caliphate, and therefore the Crimean khans had to recognize the Ottoman caliph as the supreme ruler, in fact, the viceroy of God on earth. At the same time, the Nogai hordes, not having their own khan, were vassals of the Crimean one, Muskovy and the Polish–Lithuanian Commonwealth paid annual tribute to the khan (until 1700 and 1699 respectively). In 1711, when Peter I of Russia went on a campaign with all his troops (80,000) to gain access to the Black Sea, he was surrounded by the army of the Crimean Khan Devlet II Giray, finding himself in a hopeless situation. And only the betrayal of the Ottoman vizier Baltacı Mehmet Pasha allowed Peter to get out of the encirclement of the Crimean Tatars. When Devlet II Giray protested against the vizier's decision, his response was: "You might know your Tatar affairs. The affairs of the Sublime Porte are entrusted to me. You do not have the right to interfere in them." Treaty of the Pruth was signed, and 10 years later, Russia declared itself an empire. In 1736, the Crimean Khan Qaplan I Giray was summoned by the Turkish Sultan Ahmed III to Persia. Understanding that Russia could take advantage of the lack of troops in Crimea, Qaplan Giray wrote to the Sultan to think twice, but the Sultan was persistent. As it was expected by Qaplan Giray, in 1736 the Russian army invaded Crimea, led by Münnich, devastated the peninsula, killed civilians and destroyed all major cities, occupied the capital, Bakhchisaray, and burnt the Khan's palace with all the archives and documents, and then left Crimea because of the epidemic that had begun in it. One year after the same was done by another Russian general—Peter Lacy. Since then, the Crimean Khanate had not been able to recover, and its slow decline began. The Russo-Turkish War of 1768 to 1774 resulted in the defeat of the Ottomans by the Russians, and according to the Treaty of Küçük Kaynarca (1774) signed after the war, Crimea became independent and the Ottomans renounced their political right to protect the Crimean Khanate. After a period of political unrest in Crimea, Imperial Russia violated the treaty and annexed the Crimean Khanate in 1783.

Due to the oppression by the Russian administration, the Crimean Tatars were forced to immigrate to the Ottoman Empire. In total, from 1783 till the beginning of the 20th century, at least 800 thousand Tatars left Crimea. In 1917, the Crimean Tatars, in an effort to recreate their statehood, announced the Crimean People's Republic—the first democratic republic in the Muslim world, where all peoples were equal in rights. The head of the republic was the young politician Noman Çelebicihan. However, a few months later the Bolsheviks captured Crimea, and Çelebicihan was killed without trial and thrown into the Black Sea. Soon in Crimea, Soviet power was established.

Through the fault of the Soviet government, which exported bread from Crimea to other regions of the country, in 1921–1922, at least 76,000 Crimean Tatars died of starvation, which became a disaster for such a small nation. In 1928, the first wave of repression against the Crimean Tatar intelligentsia was launched, in particular, the head of the Crimean ASSR Veli İbraimov was executed in a fabricated case. In 1938, the second wave of repression against the Crimean Tatar intelligentsia was started, during which many Crimean Tatar writers, scientists, poets, politicians, teachers were killed (Asan Sabri Ayvazov, Usein Bodaninsky, Seitdzhelil Hattatov, Ilyas Tarhan and many others). In May 1944, the USSR State Defense Committee ordered the total deportation of all the Crimean Tatars from Crimea. The deportees were transported in
cattle trains to Central Asia, primarily to Uzbekistan. During the deportation and in the first years of being in exile, 46% of Crimean Tatars died. In 1956, Khrushchev exposed Stalin's cult of personality and allowed deported peoples to return to their homeland. The exception was the Crimean Tatars. Since then, a powerful national movement of the Crimean Tatars, supported abroad and by Soviet dissidents, began, and in 1989 the Supreme Soviet of the Soviet Union was made to condemn the deportation of Crimean Tatars from their motherland as inhumane and lawless. Crimean Tatars began to return to their homeland. Today, Crimean Tatars constitute approximately 12% of the population of Crimea. There is a large diaspora in Turkey and Uzbekistan, but most (especially in Turkey) of them do not consider themselves Crimean Tatars. Still, there remains a diaspora in Dobruja, where most of the Tatars keep identifying themselves as Crimean Tatars.

Nowadays, the Crimean Tatars comprise three sub-ethnic groups:
 the Tats (not to be confused with Tat people, living in the Caucasus region) who used to inhabit the Crimean Mountains before 1944
 the Yalıboylu who lived on the southern coast of the peninsula
 the Noğays who used to live in the northern part of the Crimea

Crimean Tatars in Dobruja

Some Crimean Tatars have lived in the territory of today's Romania and Bulgaria since the 13th century. In Romania, according to the 2002 census, 24,000 people declared their ethnicity as Tatar, most of them being Crimean Tatars living in Constanța County in the region of Dobruja. Most of the Crimean Tatars, living in Romania and Bulgaria nowadays, left the Crimean peninsula for Dobruja after the annexation of Crimea by the Russian Empire.

Dobrujan Tatars have been present in Romania since the 13th century. The Tatars first reached the mouths of the Danube in the mid-13th century at the height of the power of the Golden Horde. In the 14th and 15th centuries the Ottoman Empire colonized Dobruja with Nogais from Budjak. Between 1593 and 1595 Tatars from Nogai and Budjak were also settled to Dobruja. Toward the end of the 16th century, about 30,000 Nogai Tatars from the Budjak were brought to Dobruja. After the Russian annexation of Crimea in 1783 Crimean Tatars began emigrating to the Ottoman coastal provinces of Dobruja (today divided between Romania and Bulgaria). Once in Dobruja most settled in the areas surrounding Mecidiye, Babadag, Köstence, Tulça, Silistre, Beştepe, or Varna and went on to create villages named in honor of their abandoned homeland such as Şirin, Yayla, Akmecit, Yalta, Kefe or Beybucak. Tatars together with Albanians served as gendarmes, who were held in high esteem by the Ottomans and received special tax privileges. The Ottomans additionally accorded a certain degree of autonomy for the Tatars who were allowed governance by their own kaymakam, Khan Mirza. The Giray dynasty (1427–1878) multiplied in Dobruja and maintained their respected position. A Dobrujan Tatar, Kara Hussein, was responsible for the destruction of the Janissary corps on orders from Sultan Mahmut II.

Lipka Tatars

The Lipka Tatars are a group of Turkic-speaking Tatars who originally settled in the Grand Duchy of Lithuania at the beginning of the 14th century. The first settlers tried to preserve their shamanistic religion and sought asylum amongst the non-Christian Lithuanians. Towards the end of the 14th century Grand Duke Vytautas the Great of Lithuania (ruled 1392–1430) invited another wave of Tatars—Muslims, this time—into the Grand Duchy. These Tatars first settled in Lithuania proper around Vilnius, Trakai, Hrodna and Kaunas and spread to other parts of the Grand Duchy that later became part of the Polish–Lithuanian Commonwealth in 1569. These areas comprise parts of present-day Lithuania, Belarus and Poland. From the very beginning of their settlement in Lithuania they were known as the Lipka Tatars.

From the 13th to 17th centuries various groups of Tatars settled and/or found refuge within the Polish–Lithuanian Commonwealth. The Grand Dukes of Lithuania especially promoted the migrations because of the Tatars' reputation as skilled warriors. The Tatar settlers were all granted szlachta (nobility) status, a tradition that survived until the end of the Commonwealth in the late-18th century. Such migrants included the Lipka Tatars (13th–14th centuries) as well as Crimean and Nogay Tatars (15th–16th centuries), all of which were notable in Polish military history, as well as Volga Tatars (16th–17th centuries). They all mostly settled in the Grand Duchy of Lithuania.

Various estimates of the Tatars in the Commonwealth in the 17th century place their numbers at about 15,000 persons and 60 villages with mosques. Numerous royal privileges, as well as internal autonomy granted by the monarchs, allowed the Tatars to preserve their religion, traditions, and culture over the centuries. The Tatars were allowed to intermarry with Christians,a practice uncommon in Europe at the time. The May Constitution of 1791 gave the Tatars representation in the Polish Sejm (parliament).

Although by the 18th century the Tatars had adopted the local language, the Islamic religion and many Tatar traditions (e.g. the sacrifice of bulls in their mosques during the main religious festivals) survived. This led to the formation of a distinctive Muslim culture, in which the elements of Muslim orthodoxy mixed with religious tolerance formed a relatively liberal society. For instance, the women in Lipka Tatar society traditionally had the same rights and status as men, and could attend non-segregated schools.

About 5,500 Tatars lived within the inter-war boundaries of Poland (1920–1939), and a Tatar cavalry unit had fought for the country's independence. The Tatars had preserved their cultural identity and sustained a number of Tatar organisations, including Tatar archives and a museum in Vilnius.

The Tatars suffered serious losses during World War II and furthermore, after the border change in 1945, a large part of them found themselves in the Soviet Union. It is estimated that about 3000 Tatars live in present-day Poland, of which about 500 declared Tatar (rather than Polish) nationality in the 2002 census. There are two Tatar villages (Bohoniki and Kruszyniany) in the north-east of present-day Poland, as well as urban Tatar communities in Warsaw, Gdańsk, Białystok, and Gorzów Wielkopolski. Tatars in Poland sometimes have a Muslim surname with a Polish ending: Ryzwanowicz; another surname sometimes adopted by more assimilated Tatars is Tatara or Tataranowicz or Taterczyński, which literally mean "son of a Tatar".

The Tatars played a relatively prominent role for such a small community in the Polish–Lithuanian Commonwealth military as well as in Polish and Lithuanian political and intellectual life. In modern-day Poland, their presence is also widely known, due in part to their noticeable role in the historical novels of Henryk Sienkiewicz (1846–1916), which are universally recognized in Poland. A number of Polish intellectual figures have also been Tatars, e.g. the prominent historian Jerzy Łojek.

A small community of Polish-speaking Tatars settled in Brooklyn, New York City, in the early-20th century. They established a mosque that remained in use .

Siberian Tatars

The Siberian Tatars occupy three distinct regions:
 a strip running west to east from Tobolsk to Tomsk
 the Altay and its spurs
 South Yeniseisk

They originated in the agglomerations of various indigenous North Asian groups which, in the region north of the Altay, reached some degree of culture between the 4th and 5th centuries, but were subdued and enslaved by the Mongols.
The 2010 census recorded 6,779 Siberian Tatars in Russia. According to the 2002 census there are 500,000 Tatars in Siberia, but 400,000 of them are Volga Tatars who settled in Siberia during periods of colonization.

Population of Tatars, 1926-2021

Gallery

Flags

Pictures

Paintings

Language

See also
 List of Tatars
 List of conflicts in Europe during Turco-Mongol rule
 Tatarophobia
 Tatar name
 Uhlan
 Serving Tatars

References

External links

 
 
 The American Turko-Tatar Association

 
Ethnic groups in Azerbaijan
Ethnic groups in Dagestan
Ethnic groups in Kazakhstan
Ethnic groups in Poland
Ethnic groups in Russia
Ethnic groups in Turkey
Ethnic groups in Ukraine
Ethnic groups in Uzbekistan
Muslim communities of Russia
Turkic peoples of Europe
Turkic peoples of Asia
Tatar diaspora